Courtney A. Kemp (born May 4, 1977) is an American television writer and producer. She created the 2014 Starz television series franchise Power Universe. She has written for such shows as The Good Wife and Beauty & the Beast.

Early life and education
Kemp was raised in Westport, Connecticut, and began reading college textbooks at the age of eight. Her father Herbert Kemp Jr was the first African American graduate of Dartmouth College Tuck School of Business. The Kemp family was one of the few African American families in Westport and faced discrimination. By the age of 10 she had begun reading plays by William Shakespeare, eventually coming up with her own stories. In 1994, she graduated from Staples High School and went on to receive her bachelor's degree from Brown University as well as her Master's in English Literature from Columbia University.

Career
Kemp had an initial plan to become a professor in literature with her degree but that did not suit her needs. She wanted a more collaborative career. She went on to land an interview at Vogue, to become an Assistant but did not land the job. She then strove to get a job for Entertainment Weekly and was questioning why that would not be possible. Kemp went on to land a position at Mademoiselle and worked at GQ for three years. She then left the industry and started writing for the J.Crew catalogue. Kemp's job at GQ landed her many good opportunities, especially getting offers from several TV producers asking her to adapt one of her pieces, on interracial dating, into a show. Although this never materialized, it made her want to start producing for the small screen.

At the age of 26, Kemp left Westport and went to Los Angeles, California to further pursue her dream as a television writer. There she garnered her big break by becoming a staff writer for the then-Fox hit series The Bernie Mac Show. She then began writing for other television shows such as Eli Stone, Justice and Beauty & the Beast (a 2012 remake of the 1987 series of the same name) before eventually becoming increasingly known for her writing of episodes for the CBS political drama series The Good Wife.

Her idea for what would become the first series she ever sold and pitched, Power, came about when she met rapper 50 Cent and executive producer Mark Canton at a coffeehouse in Los Angeles. She thought up the concept of a guy destined to leave his life as a drug dealer behind him to become a successful club owner and businessman, and soon penned the script with 50 Cent and Canton alongside her, both serving as executive producers. The show aired on the Starz network from June 7, 2014 to February 9, 2020 and received critical acclaim.

The success of the show spawned several spin-offs including Power Book II: Ghost which premiered on September 6, 2020. Kemp served as the showrunner for the show. In August 2021, she signed a deal with Netflix.

Personal life
Kemp lost her father, Herbert Kemp Jr., in 2011. The first episode of Power was dedicated to his memory and he was the inspiration behind the main character James "Ghost" St. Patrick.

Courtney and her family lived in Westport, Connecticut where they were one of few black families residing in the town at the time and suffered racial harassment.

Kemp describes herself as having been a voracious reader in her youth with an interest in politics.

She has a daughter named Charlie. Her ex-husband, a former Senior Vice President of Business Affairs at Paramount Pictures named Brian Mawuli Agboh, filed for a divorce in 2016.

References

External links
 

1977 births
Living people
African-American screenwriters
American women television producers
American television writers
Brown University alumni
Columbia Graduate School of Arts and Sciences alumni
American women screenwriters
American women television writers
Showrunners
21st-century American women writers
Screenwriters from Connecticut
Staples High School alumni
21st-century American screenwriters
Television producers from Connecticut
21st-century African-American women writers
21st-century African-American writers
20th-century African-American people
20th-century African-American women